Milutin Šoškić (Serbian Cyrillic: Милутин Шошкић; 31 December 1937 – 27 August 2022) was a Serbian professional footballer who played as a goalkeeper. He is considered one of FK Partizan's greatest players.

Biography
He was born in Jablanica, a village near Peć from father Jeremija, a royal officer and mother Radunka, as the fourth child in the family. The ancestor of the Šoškić family is from Bratonožići, at the beginning of the 18th century he moved to Ulotina, and one branch of the family later went to live in Jablanica. He grew up in a patriarchal family. World War II he spent in exile in Serbian Patriarchate of Peć.

Playing career
Šoškić started training football when he was 11 in Red Star, for which he played six months, but because of a small misunderstanding with the host of the stadium, he decided to continue his career at Partizan where he spent most of his career.

Soon after Šoškić was called to play for Yugoslavia youth team, captain and the best individual of Partizan youth setup which won two National Championship titles. He quickly became standard starter for the first team of the Black-Whites, for which he played totally 387 matches during his time at the club.

After performing well at Partizan he was invited to play for the national team of Yugoslavia. Šoškić inherited the position of Vladimir Beara as a new goalkeeper. For Yugoslavia he played 50 games.

First big competition that Šoškić played with the national team was 1960 European Nations' Cup. Team won the silver medal after winning in semi-final match against competition host France with the result of 5–4 which is still a record to this day of most goals scored in a single match in UEFA European Championship. In the finals Yugoslavia was defeated by Soviet Union 2–1 after extra time.

That same year Šoškić won an Olympic gold medal at the 1960 Summer Olympics in Rome, Italy with the Yugoslavia national team. They topped their pool consisting of Bulgaria, United Arab Republic and Turkey before beating Italy in the semi-finals and crowning themselves champions after beating Denmark 3–1 in the final. At the tournament, Šoškić only conceded six goals.

At the 1962 FIFA World Cup in Chile Yugoslavia won fourth place after being defeated by Czechoslovakia 3–1 in semi-finals and Chile 1–0 in a third place match.

Šoškić experienced great recognition when he was invited to play in the 1963 England v Rest of the World football match at Wembley Stadium and secured his place among best football players of that time.

European Cup with Partizan
In the sixties "Partizan's babies" were dominant to that extent in Yugoslav First League so much that in five league seasons they lifted the trophy four times, of that three times in a row 1960–61, 1961–62 and 1962–63.

By winning the Yugoslav championship in the 1964–65 season, Partizan acquired the right to play in the European Cup 1965–66. Partizan was led by coach Abdulah Gegić.

In the preliminary round Partizan played against French champions FC Nantes. With a 2:0 win in Belgrade at JNA Stadium and a draw 2:2 in a return match at Stade Marcel-Saupin, first obstacle was skipped with a total score of 4:2.

The next opponent was the champion of West Germany, SV Werder Bremen. Werder was eliminated with a total score of 3:1, in Belgrade it was 3:0 and on Weser-Stadion in Bremen 0:1.

In the quarter-finals Partizan had to face champions of Czechoslovakia, AC Sparta Prague. First game at Stadion Letná Partizan lost with 4:1, but won the second game in Belgrade with the result 5:0 and thus qualified for the semi-finals with a total score of 6:4.

In the semi-finals, they were facing English giants Manchester United with David Herd, Denis Law, Bobby Charlton and George Best. Partizan's babies won with a total score of 2:1 (2:0 in Belgrade and 0:1 in the return match at Old Trafford) and advanced to the finals.

On 11 May 1966, European Cup Final was played at Heysel Stadium in Brussels in front of 55,000 spectators. Partizan faced Spanish champions Real Madrid and took the lead in the 55th minute with a goal by Velibor Vasović. However, with two goals first by Amancio and second by Fernando Serena, Real managed to defeat Partizan and win the European title.

Going abroad
When the conditions for going abroad were met, Šoškić decided to accept the offer of the West German FC Köln. He had the status of the first goalkeeper in the new club and good financial conditions. With good games, he gained the respect of his teammates and fans. However, a severe leg fracture soon followed, which caused a long break and jeopardized the continuation of his career. Šoškić returned to active football, but a new leg fracture finally forced him to end his career.

Coaching career
After finishing his playing career, he finished high school coaching. He then became a coach at OFK Beograd which he remained for 5 years. Then he took over OFK Kikinda which he led in Yugoslav Second League. Then he returned to Partizan to be one of the assistant coaches. He worked together with Bora Milutinović and Nenad Bjeković. At that time, Partizan had several quality goalkeepers such as: Fahrudin Omerović, Ranko Stojić and Rade Zalad.

After Milutinović became the coach of United States national soccer team in 1993 Šoškić was appointed the goalkeeper's coach. He remained even after Milutinović left in 1995, continuing to work with the team under head coaches Steve Sampson and later Bruce Arena. He left the team along with Arena after the 2006 FIFA World Cup. During that time, the Americans participated in four World cups and had several quality goalkeepers such as: Brad Friedel, Kasey Keller, and Tim Howard.

Death 
Šoškić died on 27 August 2022.

References

External links

 
 

1937 births
2022 deaths
Sportspeople from Peja
Kosovo Serbs
Serbian footballers
Yugoslav footballers
Association football goalkeepers
Yugoslavia international footballers
1960 European Nations' Cup players
1962 FIFA World Cup players
Olympic medalists in football
Footballers at the 1960 Summer Olympics
Olympic footballers of Yugoslavia
Olympic gold medalists for Yugoslavia
FK Partizan players
1. FC Köln players
FK Partizan managers
OFK Beograd managers
Yugoslav First League players
Bundesliga players
Serbian football managers
Yugoslav football managers
FK Partizan non-playing staff
United States men's national soccer team non-playing staff
Medalists at the 1960 Summer Olympics
Serbian expatriate footballers
Yugoslav expatriate sportspeople in Germany
Expatriate footballers in West Germany
Expatriate footballers in Germany